Leoš Hlaváček (born 30 October 1963 in Pardubice) is a Czech sport shooter. He competed in skeet shooting events at the Summer Olympics in 1988, 1992, and 1996.

Olympic results

References

1963 births
Living people
Skeet shooters
Czech male sport shooters
Shooters at the 1988 Summer Olympics
Shooters at the 1992 Summer Olympics
Shooters at the 1996 Summer Olympics
Olympic shooters of Czechoslovakia
Olympic shooters of the Czech Republic
Sportspeople from Pardubice